Fussballclub Zürich, commonly abbreviated to FC Zürich or simply FCZ, is a Swiss football club based in Zürich. The club was founded in 1896 and has won the Swiss Super League 13 times and the Swiss Cup 10 times. The most recent titles are the 2022 Swiss Super League and the 2018 Swiss Cup. The club plays its home games at the Letzigrund, which reaches a capacity of 26,000 spectators for league games.  

FC Zürich is the only Swiss team to have reached the semi-finals of the European Cup more than once. This happened in 1964 and 1977, when the competition was played in its original format.  

The women's department features a 1st team playing in the Swiss Women's Super League, the only existing women's U21 team in Switzerland (competing in the top ranks of second tier Nationalliga B), and furthermore a U19, U17, U15 and U14 team. The U17, U15 and U14 teams compete in junior leagues against boys teams. The FC Zürich women's teams roots originate in the first Swiss women's football club DFC Zürich and it is with 22 championship titles and multiple Champions League participations the most successful of Switzerland.

History

1896–1924 
The club was founded in summer 1896 by former members of the two local clubs FC Turicum and FC Excelsior. Later, the official founding date was set at 1 August 1896. One of the founding members was the later FC Barcelona founder, Joan Gamper, coaching and playing for FC Excelsior and its successor from 1894 to 1897. The new club played its first game on 30 August 1896 on Velorennbahn Hardau in Zürich against FC Phönix St. Gallen with a 3:3 draw. In 1898, FC Excelsior completely merged with FC Zürich and local club FC Victoria joined shortly thereafter.

The debut game was in 1896 with the colors blue and white. The colors were changed to red and white; rivals Grasshopper Club Zürich had the same colors. When Grasshopper Club temporarily retired from the championship in 1909, FCZ returned to the colors blue and white which they continue to use. Zürich won its first title in the Swiss Serie A in 1901–02, but did not win it again until 1923–24.

Until the 1930s, the club's sporting remit included rowing, boxing, athletics, and handball, but football would become the focus of the club.

1925–1960 

From 1925 to 1960, Zürich struggled to overcome an unsuccessful record and was described as the "wilderness years". They were relegated in 1933–34, playing in the 1. Liga to the 1941 season. In 1940–41, they returned to the Nationalliga, where they stayed until their relegation in 1945–46. They were back in the Nationalliga A in 1947–48 and stayed in the top flight until relegated in 1956–57. They were promoted from the Nationalliga B to contest the 1958–59 Nationalliga A, finishing in third place.

1960–1981 
This period was known as the "Golden Years" by the FCZ faithful. At this time, the club was run by the legendary President Edwin Nägeli and had players such as Köbi Kuhn, Fritz Künzli, Ilija Katić, René Botteron, and many more. Zürich won seven championships in the years 1963, 1966, 1968, 1974, 1975, 1976 and 1981. They also won the Swiss Cup five times in 1966, 1970, 1972, 1973, and in 1976. FCZ also had much success internationally in reaching the semi-finals of the European Cup 1963–64, before losing to Real Madrid and also reaching the semi-finals in the European Cup 1976–77, where they lost to Liverpool.

1981–2005 
Following the club's league title in 1981, the club went into a decline and in 1988 they were relegated to the Nationalliga B. Zürich returned to the top league in 1990. The club did make it to last 16 of the UEFA Cup 1998–99, but were beaten by Roma. The club won the Swiss Cup in 2000, beating Lausanne in the final and also in 2005 beating Luzern.

2006–2016 

On 13 May 2006, FCZ ended their 25 years effort to win Super League with a goal in the 93rd minute by Iulian Filipescu against FC Basel. The goal gave FCZ a 2 – 1 victory based on goal difference. They sustained the league title In 2006–07.

In 2008 the local women's team FFC Zürich Seebach was combined with FC Zürich and would play under the name FC Zürich Frauen in the Swiss national league. FC Zürich Frauen is Swiss record champion.

In the 2007–08 season, FCZ (men's team) finished in third place. In a 2008–09 season match, they edged pass BSC Young Boys to win the league title. In 2009, they made their debut play for the group-stage of the UEFA Champions League. In the 2010–11 season FCZ finished second. The following seasons they finished mostly in mid-table positions. FCZ won the Swiss Cup 2014 in extra time against FC Basel 2 to 0.

In the 2015–16 season the club finished last, one point behind FC Lugano and was relegated to the Swiss Challenge League. Four days after the final game of the season FCZ won the Swiss Cup 2016 beating FC Lugano 1 to 0.

Recent years 
In the 2016–17 season FC Zürich won the Challenge League ahead of Neuchâtel Xamax and returned after one year to the Super League. In the 2017–2018 season they finished 4th. On 27 May 2018 they won the Swiss Cup for the tenth time, beating BSC Young Boys 2:1.

In the 2021–2022 season, FC Zürich won the Super League again after an interruption of 13 years. The club secured its 13th league title with a 2-0 away win over FC Basel, who finished second, on 1 May 2022 with five rounds to go. Despite this success, coach André Breitenreiter departed the club to join Bundesliga side TSG 1899 Hoffenheim on 24 May 2022. On 8 June 2022, former Austrian national coach Franco Foda was announced as the coach for the upcoming season. 
Despite being able to guide Zürich into the Europa League group stages, an abysmal start to the domestic campaign saw the side gain only two points out of a possible twenty-four in their title defence. The dreadful league form, combined with a shock cup defeat to Challenge League side Lausanne on 18 September, proved the final straw and Foda was subsequently sacked on 21 September.

Honours 
Super League/Nationalliga A
Champions (13): 1901–02, 1923–24, 1962–63, 1965–66, 1967–68, 1973–74, 1974–75, 1975–76, 1980–81, 2005–06, 2006–07, 2008–09, 2021–22
 Challenge League/Nationalliga B: 
Winner (4): 1940–41, 1946–47, 1957–58, 2016–17
 Swiss Cup
Winners (10): 1965–66, 1969–70, 1971–72, 1972–73, 1975–76, 1999–2000, 2004–05, 2013–14, 2015–16, 2017–18
 Swiss League Cup
Winners: 1980–81
European Cup/UEFA Champions League
Semi-finalists: 1963–64, 1976–77

Rivalries 

Grasshopper, also from Zürich, and FC Basel are the main rivals of FCZ. Due to the intense rivalry, these matches are so-called high-risk fixtures, with an increased police presence in and around the stadium.

Zürich 

Since its inception, FCZ has always had a fiery relationship with neighbouring club Grasshopper over sporting supremacy in the city. 

To date, 251 official derbies have been held, with Grasshopper leading with 121 wins to FC Zurich's 90, leaving 39 draws. However, since the reformation of the Swiss Super League in 2003, FCZ has frequently gotten the better of their city rivals, winning 33 out of 68 games (GC won 20 and 15 draws).

Final vs. FC Basel, 13 May 2006 

Before the last round of the 2005–06 Swiss Super League, Zürich were three points behind FC Basel in the league table. The last game of the season was contested by these two clubs vying for the league title at St. Jakob Park, Basel. Alhassane Keita scored the match first goal, for Zürich. In the second half, Mladen Petrić equalised. FC Basel were seconds away from the title when in the 93rd minute, Florian Stahel passed the ball to Iulian Filipescu, who scored. Zürich's success at 2 – 1 was attributed to their superior goal difference. Following the final whistle, Basel supporters stormed the pitch and attacked players on both teams.

Infrastructure
In 2010, the youth and women's teams of the club moved their homebase to the Heerenschürli sport park in the city quarter of Hirzenbach where the academy and women's teams play also their home matches. In June 2022, the club moved with the opening of a newly built "House of FCZ" also their Super League team and offices there in order to have the whole organisation under one roof.

Players

Current squad

Out on loan

Reserve squad/Zürich U21
The Zürich II/U21 team plays in the Swiss Promotion League.

Notable former players
 
Players and managers admitted to the FC Zurich Hall of Fame

  Jakob Kuhn
  Walter Bosshard
  Urs Fischer
  Fritz Künzli
  Rosario Martinelli
  Almen Abdi
  Lucien Favre
  Joan Gamper
  Karl Grob
  Daniel Gygax
  Daniel Jeandupeux
  Timo Konietzka
  Werner Leimgruber
  Louis Maurer
  Raimondo Ponte
  Ike Shorunmu
  Klaus Stürmer
  Hannu Tihinen
  René Botteron
  Frédéric Chassot
  Josip Drmić
  Blerim Džemaili
  Iulian Filipescu
  Jurica Jerković
  Alhassane Keita
  Shabani Nonda
  Peter Risi
  Wynton Rufer
  Albert Schnorf
  Paul Sturzenegger

Players for the Swiss national football team

  Almen Abdi
  Heinz Bäni
  Heinz Barmettler
  Loris Benito
  Thomas Bickel
  René Botteron
  René Brodmann
  Patrick Bühlmann
  Sandro Burki
  Pierre-Albert Chapuisat
  Frédéric Chassot
  Davide Chiumiento
  Joël Corminbœuf
  Francesco Di Jorio
  Josip Drmić
  Blerim Džemaili
  Ruedi Elsener
  Nico Elvedi
  Urs Fischer
  Mario Gavranović
  Christoph Gilli
  Marco Grassi
  Karl Grob
  René Hasler
  Marc Hodel
  Josef Hügi
  Gökhan Inler
  Daniel Jeandupeux
  Sébastien Jeanneret
  Stephan Keller
  Fritz Kehl
  Jakob Kuhn
  Fritz Künzli
  Adrian Kunz
  August Lehmann
  Werner Leimgruber
  Johnny Leoni
  Heinz Lüdi
  Erni Maissen
  Ludovic Magnin
  Xavier Margairaz
  Peter Marti
  Giuseppe Mazzarelli
  Admir Mehmedi
  Severino Minelli
  André Muff
  Alain Nef
  Dimitri Oberlin
  Bećir Omeragić
  Marco Pascolo
  Yvan Quentin
  Peter Risi
  Alain Rochat
  Ricardo Rodríguez
  Ernst Rutschmann
  Marco Schönbächler
  Werner Schley
  Walter Schneiter
  David Sesa
  Simon Sohm
  Adolf Stelzer
  Jörg Stiel
  Pirmin Stierli
  Xavier Stierli
  Jürg Studer
  Scott Sutter
  Markus Tanner
  Sirio Vernati
  Steve von Bergen
  Johan Vonlanthen
  René Weiler
  Adrian Winter
  Rolf Wüthrich
  Gian-Pietro Zappa
  Hans-Peter Zwicker

Players with World Cup appearances for their national teams

  Borislav Mihaylov
  Jan Berger
  Peter Møller
  Jean-Marc Ferreri
  Norbert Eder
  Roberto Di Matteo
  Kanga Akale
  Wynton Rufer
  Ike Shorunmu
  Rashidi Yekini
  Iulian Filipescu
  Adrian Ilie
  Aleksandr Kerzhakov
  Shaun Bartlett
  Tomas Brolin
  Roger Ljung
  Jonas Thern
  Conny Torstensson
  Francileudo Santos
  Yassine Chikhaoui
  Mirsad Baljić
  Jurica Jerković

Player record
Players in bold are still part of the club.

Managers

 József "Csiby" Winkler (1920–22)
 Johann Studnicka (1922–25)
 Severino Minelli (1943–46)
 Willy Iseli (1946–48)
 Theodor Lohrmann (1948–53)
 Joksch Fridl (1953–55)
 Ossi Müller (1955–57)
 Fernando Molina and  Max Barras (1957–58)
 Karl Rappan (1958–59)
 Max Barras (1959–60)
 Georg Wurzer (1960–62)
 Louis Maurer (1962–66)
 László Kubala (July 1966 – Feb 67)
 René Brodmann (Feb 1967 – July 67)
 Lev Mantula (1967–69)
 Georg Gawliczek (1 July 1969 – 31 December 1970)
 Juan Schwanner (November 1970 – July 71)
 Friedhelm Konietzka (1971–78)
 Zlatko Čajkovski (July 1978 – March 80)
 Albert Sing and  R. Martinelli (29 Feb 1980 – 30 June 1980)
 Daniel Jeandupeux (1 July 1980 – March 83)
 Heini Glättli (March 1983 – April 83)
 Max Merkel (April 1983 – May 83)
 Köbi Kuhn (May 1983 – July 83)
 Hans Kodric (July 1983 – November 83)
 Köbi Kuhn (November 1983 – July 84)
 Vaclav Jezek (1984–86)
 Hermann Stessl (1 July 1986 – 1 November 1987)
 Friedhelm Konietzka (Sept 1987 – July 88)
 Hans Bongartz (1 July 1988 – 30 June 1989)
 Walter Iselin (July 1989 – October 89)
 Herbert Neumann (October 1989 –1 October 1991)
 Kurt Jara (1 October 1991 – 1 April 1994)
 Bob Houghton (April 1994 – March 95)
 Raimondo Ponte (March 1995 – 16 April 2000)
 Gilbert Gress (16 April 2000 – 30 June 2001)
 Georges Bregy (1 July 2001 – 27 March 2003)
 Walter Grüter (interim) (27 March 2003 – 30 June 2003)
 Lucien Favre (1 July 2003 – 30 June 2007)
 Bernard Challandes (1 July 2007 – 19 April 2010)
 Urs Fischer (interim) (19 April 2010 – 30 June 2010)
 Urs Fischer (1 July 2010 – 12 March 2012)
 Harald Gämperle (interim) (13 March 2012 – 8 June 2012)
 Urs Meier (interim) (14 April 2012 – 24 May 2012)
 Rolf Fringer (1 July 2012 – 26 November 2012)
 Urs Meier (interim) (26 November 2012 – 30 December 2012)
 Urs Meier (1 Jan 2013 – 3 August 2015)
 Massimo Rizzo (interim) (3 August 2015 – 31 August 2015)
 Sami Hyypiä (31 August 2015 – 12 May 2016)
 Uli Forte (13 May 2016 – 20 February 2018)
 Ludovic Magnin (20 February 2018 – 5 October 2020)
 Massimo Rizzo (interim) (5 October 2020 – 23 December 2020)
 Massimo Rizzo (24 December 2020 – 30 June 2021)
 André Breitenreiter (1 July 2021 – 24 May 2022)
 Franco Foda (9 June 2022 – 21 September 2022)
 Genesio Colatrella (interim) (22 September 2022 – 10 October 2022)
 Bo Henriksen (11 October 2022 – )

FC Zürich in European football 
As of 18 August 2022.

References

External links 

 FC Zürich stats 
 Archive FC Zürich 
 Copa90: Zurich On Fire! - FC Zürich vs Grasshopper Club

 
Sport in Zürich
Football clubs in Switzerland
Association football clubs established in 1896
1896 establishments in Switzerland